Events from the year 1658 in France

Incumbents
 Monarch – Louis XIV

Events

14 June – Battle of the Dunes
The siege of Dunkirk

Births

11 October – Henri de Boulainvilliers, nobleman and historian (died 1722)

Deaths
18 June – Louis Cappel, clergyman (born 1585)
September – Lucy Walter, royal mistress (born c.1630 in Wales)
20 October – Louis Cellot, Jesuit writer (born 1588)
6 November – Pierre du Ryer, dramatist (born 1606)
Full date missing – Hubert Le Sueur, sculptor (born c.1580)

See also

References

1650s in France